The 1998 All-Big Ten Conference football team consists of American football players chosen as All-Big Ten Conference players for the 1998 NCAA Division I-A football season.  The conference recognizes two official All-Big Ten selectors: (1) the Big Ten conference coaches selected separate offensive and defensive units and named first- and second-team players (the "Coaches" team); and (2) a panel of sports writers and broadcasters covering the Big Ten also selected offensive and defensive units and named first- and second-team players (the "Media" team).

Offensive selections

Quarterbacks
 Joe Germaine, Ohio State (Coaches-1; Media-1)
 Drew Brees, Purdue Coaches-2; Media-2)

Running backs
 Ron Dayne, Wisconsin (Coaches-1; Media-1)
 Michael Wiley, Ohio State (Coaches-1; Media-1)
 Sedrick Irvin, Michigan State (Coaches-2; Media-2)
 Thomas Hamner, Minnesota (Coaches-2; Media-2)

Centers
 Jason Strayhorn, Michigan State (Coaches-1; Media-1)
 Casey Rabach, Wisconsin (Coaches-2; Media-2)

Guards
 Steve Hutchinson, Michigan (Coaches-1; Media-1)
 Rob Murphy, Ohio State (Coaches-1; Media-1)
 Ben Gilbert, Ohio State (Coaches-2; Media-2)
 Chukky Okobi, Purdue (Coaches-2)
 Kareem McKenzie, Penn State (Media-2)

Tackles
 Jon Jansen, Michigan (Coaches-1; Media-1)
 Floyd Wedderburn, Penn State (Coaches-1; Media-2)
 Aaron Gibson, Wisconsin (Coaches-2; Media-1)
 Chris McIntosh, Wisconsin (Coaches-2)
 Jeff Backus, Michigan (Media-2)

Tight ends
 Jerame Tuman, Michigan (Coaches-1; Media-1)
 John Lumpkin, Ohio State (Coaches-2; Media-2)

Receivers
 David Boston, Ohio State (Coaches-1; Media-1)
 D'Wayne Bates, Northwestern (Coaches-1; Media-1)
 Tai Streets, Michigan (Coaches-2; Media-2)
 Dee Miller, Ohio State (Coaches-2; Media-2)
 Plaxico Burress, Michigan State (Media-2)

Defensive selections

Defensive linemen
 Tom Burke, Wisconsin (Coaches-1; Media-1)
 Rosevelt Colvin, Purdue (Coaches-1; Media-1)
 Jared DeVries, Iowa (Coaches-1; Media-1)
 Brad Scioli, Penn State (Coaches-1; Media-2)
 Courtney Brown, Penn State (Coaches-2; Media-1)
 Adewale Ogunleye, Indiana (Coaches-2; Media-2)
 James Hall, Michigan (Coaches-2; Media-2)
 Robert Newkirk, Michigan State (Coaches-2)
 Rob Renes, Michigan (Media-2)

Linebackers
 LaVar Arrington, Penn State (Coaches-1; Media-1)
 Na'il Diggs, Ohio State (Coaches-1; Media-2)
 Brandon Short, Penn State (Coaches-1)
 Barry Gardner, Northwestern (Coaches-2; Media-1)
 Andy Katzenmoyer, Ohio State (Coaches-2; Media-1)
 Sam Sword, Michigan (Coaches-2; Media-2)
 Ian Gold, Michigan (Media-2)

Defensive backs
 Antoine Winfield, Ohio State (Coaches-1; Media-1)
 Tyrone Carter, Minnesota (Coaches-1; Media-1)
 Damon Moore, Ohio State (Coaches-1; Media-1)
 David Macklin, Penn State (Coaches-1; Media-2)
 Jamar Fletcher, Wisconsin (Coaches-2; Media-1)
 Tommy Hendricks, Michigan (Coaches-2; Media-2)
 Andre Weathers, Michigan (Coaches-2)
 Sorie Kanu, Michigan State (Coaches-2)
 Ahmed Plummer, Ohio State (Media-2)
 Eric Thigpen, Iowa (Media-2)

Special teams

Kickers
 Matt Davenport, Wisconsin (Coaches-1; Media-1)
 Paul Edinger, Michigan State (Coaches-2; Media-2)

Punters
 Kevin Stemke, Wisconsin (Coaches-1; Media-1)
 Brent Bartholomew, Ohio State (Coaches-2)
 Craig Jarrett, Michigan State (Media-2)

Key

See also
1998 College Football All-America Team

References

All-Big Ten Conference
All-Big Ten Conference football teams